Synemon catocaloides is a moth in the Castniidae family. It is found in Australia, including northern Western Australia.

The larvae probably feed on the roots of Ecdeiocolea monostachya.

References

Moths described in 1865
Castniidae